Thomas Raymond Briggs (11 May 1919 in Rotherham, England – 1999) was an English footballer, who played as a defender who played for Huddersfield Town and Crewe Alexandra.

1919 births
Footballers from Rotherham
1999 deaths
English footballers
Association football fullbacks
Huddersfield Town A.F.C. players
Crewe Alexandra F.C. players
English Football League players